Eccellenza Molise is the regional Eccellenza football division for clubs in the southern Italian region of Molise. It consists of 16 teams competing in one group. The winning team is promoted to Serie D, the top level of Italian amateur football. The club that finishes second may also gain promotion by taking part in a two-round national play-off.

Champions 
The past champions of Eccellenza Molise were

1992–93 Campobasso
1993–94 Roccaravindola
1994–95 Interamnia
1995–96 Frenter Larino
1996–97 Campobasso
1997–98 Real Isernia
1998–99 Bojano
1999–2000 Termoli
2000–01 S.Giorgio Collathia
2001–02 Termoli
2002–03 Bojano
2003–04 Venafro	
2004–05 Campobasso
2005–06 Petacciato
2006–07 Olympia Agnonese
2007–08 Atletico Trivento
2008–09 Bojano
2009–10 Venafro
2010–11 Isernia
2011–12 Termoli
2012–13 Bojano
2013–14 Campobasso
2014–15 Isernia
2015–16 Gioventù Dauna
2016–17 Macchia
2017–18 Isernia
2018–19 Vastogirardi
2019–20 Comprensorio Vairano
2020–21 Aurora Alto Casertano
2021–22 Termoli

References 

Sport in Molise
Mol
Sports leagues established in 1991
1991 establishments in Italy
Football clubs in Italy
Association football clubs established in 1991